The 2018–19 Minnesota Whitecaps season was the first in franchise history as a member of the National Women's Hockey League, in which the team won the Isobel Cup during their inaugural year.

Background
On May 15, 2018, the NWHL announced that it had an agreement in principle to acquire ownership of the Whitecaps. The team is expected to join the NWHL as an expansion team for the 2018–19 season. The NWHL arranged with the Minnesota Wild to use TRIA Rink, the Wild's practice facility, as the site for Whitecaps home games. It was reported that the Whitecaps had hired 2018 Olympic gold medal-winning coach Robb Stauber and his wife Shivaun Stauber as coaches, sharing the head coaching responsibilities, but the parties never signed a contract. Whitecaps' founder and general manager Jack Brodt then returned to the coaching position he held prior to joining the NWHL and hired former University of Minnesota player Ronda Curtin Engelhardt as co-coach.

The NWHL unveiled a new logo for the Whitecaps on August 21, 2018. Created by M Style Marketing, the colors incorporate blue, while, silver and black.

Regular season

News and notes
On December 29, 2018, the Whitecaps faced the Buffalo Beauts at the KeyBank Center. The event was part of a doubleheader involving both the NWHL and the NHL. After the Whitecaps vs. Beauts game, the Buffalo Sabres hosted the Boston Bruins.

Schedule

|- style="background:#cfc;"
| October 6 || 6:30 pm || Metropolitan Riveters || 4–0, Whitecaps || 1–0–0
|- style="background:#cfc;"
| October 7 || 2:00 pm || Metropolitan Riveters || 3–1, Whitecaps || 2–0–0
|- style="background:#cfc;"
| October 20 || 2:00 pm || at Metropolitan Riveters || 5-3, Whitecaps || 3-0-0
|- style="background:#cfc;"
| October 21 || 3:00 pm || at Metropolitan Riveters || 6-2, Whitecaps || 4-0-0
|- style="background:#cfc;"
| October 27 || 6:30 pm || Buffalo Beauts || 3-2, Whitecaps || 5-0-0
|- style="background:#cfc;"
| October 28 || 2:00 pm || Buffalo Beauts || 2-1, Whitecaps || 6-0-0
|- style="background:#ffbbbb"
| December 1|| 6:30 pm || Boston Pride || 1-5, Pride || 6-1-0
|- style="background:#ffbbbb"
| December 2|| 2:00 pm || Boston Pride || 2-7, Pride || 6-2-0
|- style="background:#cfc;"
| December 29 || 2:00 pm || at Buffalo Beauts (KeyBank Center) || 2-1, Whitecaps || 7-2-0
|- style="background:#ffbbbb"
| December 30 ||  1:30 pm || at Buffalo Beauts || 0-4, Beauts || 7-3-0
|- style="background:#ffbbbb"
| January 12 || 7:30 pm || at Boston Pride || 4-5, Pride || 7-4-0
|- style="background:#cfc;"
| January 13 || 3:00 pm || at Connecticut Whale || 4-1, Whitecaps || 8-4-0
|- style="background:#cfc;"
| January 19 || 6:30 pm || Connecticut Whale || 2-0, Whitecaps || 9-4-0
|- style="background:#cfc;"
| January 20 || 2:00 pm || Connecticut Whale || 9-0, Whitecaps || 10-4-0
|- style="background:#cfc;"
| March 2 || 7:30 pm || at Boston Pride || 2-1, Whitecaps || 11-4-0
|- style="background:#cfc;"
| March 3 || 3:00 pm || at Connecticut Whale || 4-1, Whitecaps || 12-4-0
|- style="background:none;"

Transactions

Signings

Awards and honors

Regular season
VEDA NWHL Player of the Week
Hannah Brandt (Awarded October 8, 2018)
Jonna Curtis (Awarded October 22, 2018)
Amanda Leveille (Awarded October 29, 2018)
Amy Menke (Awarded January 14, 2019)

VEDA NWHL Stars of the Week
Minnesota Whitecaps fans (Awarded January 22, 2019)

References

External links
 

NWHL
2018–19 NWHL season
2018–19 NWHL season by team
Minnesota Whitecaps
Premier Hockey Federation seasons by team